Pitiengomon is a village in northern Ivory Coast. It is in the sub-prefecture of Niofoin, Korhogo Department, Poro Region, Savanes District.

Pitiengomon was a commune until March 2012, when it became one of 1126 communes nationwide that were abolished.

Notes

Former communes of Ivory Coast
Populated places in Savanes District
Populated places in Poro Region